Iona is an unincorporated area in Elgin County, Ontario, Canada, approximately 20 kms west-southwest of St. Thomas. It is located at the junction of County Road 14 and Talbot Line. Surrounded by farmland the junction is mostly residential with a few businesses:

 Holland House Restaurant & Tavern
 Iona General Store and Antiques. 
 Iona Christian Fellowship

See also

 List of unincorporated communities in Ontario

Communities in Elgin County